The 2011–12 Dallas Mavericks season was the 32nd season of the franchise in the National Basketball Association (NBA). The Mavericks entered the season as the defending NBA champions, having defeated the Miami Heat in six games in the 2011 NBA Finals. They were attempting to win back-to-back NBA Finals, but were swept in the first round of the NBA Playoffs by the Oklahoma City Thunder (the team that the Mavericks defeated in last year's Western Conference Finals in five games) in four games. The Thunder would go on to lose to the Heat in the Finals in five games.

The season officially began once NBA players and owners signed a new collective bargaining agreement to end the 2011 NBA lockout.

Key dates
 June 23: The 2011 NBA draft took place at Prudential Center in Newark, New Jersey.

Draft picks

At the Draft night the Mavs acquired Rudy Fernández for their 26th pick, Jordan Hamilton, who was sent to Denver.

Offseason
Following their championship-winning 2010–2011 season, the Mavericks entered the offseason with six free agents; only one of those six players returned to play with the team in 2011–2012. Starting center Tyson Chandler was traded to the New York Knicks in a three-team sign-and-trade deal; the Mavericks received guard Andy Rautins in return(in addition to a 2012 second-round pick and a traded player exception) and waived him shortly thereafter. Forward Caron Butler signed a three-year deal worth $24 million with the Los Angeles Clippers. On December 14, reserve guard José Juan Barea announced that he would join the Minnesota Timberwolves. On December 19, reserve forward Peja Stojaković announced his retirement. Guard DeShawn Stevenson signed a one-year deal with New Jersey. Backup forward Brian Cardinal re-signed with the Mavs.

The Mavericks acquired several new players during the offseason. On December 9, the Mavs signed power forward Brandan Wright. Vince Carter signed a contract on December 11, while Lamar Odom came to the Mavs through a trade with the Los Angeles Lakers. Drew Neitzel and Jerome Randle were signed on December 11; Neitzel and Randle were both waived on December 21 after playing in the D-League for the Texas Legends.  The Mavs signed guard Delonte West on December 12 to a one-year deal. The Mavericks traded Rudy Fernández and Corey Brewer to the Denver Nuggets for a future second-round pick (and a traded player exception). The Mavericks signed Sean Williams on December 21 to a two-year deal. Free agent Yi Jianlian was signed on January 6 to a one-year deal.

Season recap

Preseason
The Mavericks lost their first preseason game to the Oklahoma City Thunder, with both Dirk Nowitzki and Jason Kidd sitting the game out. With Kidd and Nowitzki back in the lineup but without Jason Terry (illness), Vince Carter and Delonte West they also lost the second and last preseason matchup against the Thunder. The Mavericks ended the preseason with a 0–2 record.

Regular season

The 2011-12 NBA regular season consisted began on Christmas Day 2011 and ended on April 26 2012. Due to a lockout agreement, the season consisted of 66 games, rather than the standard 82. The Dallas Mavericks entered the 2011-12 NBA season as defending champions, having defeated the Miami Heat in the previous season's finals series in 6 games. Entering the following year, NBA analysis experts predicted the franchise would win 35 games and lose 31. At the conclusion of the 2012 regular season their record consisted of 36 wins and 30 losses. With a record of 36 wins and 30 losses, the Dallas Mavericks finished 7th in the NBA Western Conference and 3rd in the NBA Southwest Division.

Playoffs
The Mavericks opened their series against Oklahoma City Thunder on the first day of the playoffs. The game was close throughout and the Mavs took the lead by seven with 2 minutes to go. Dirk Nowitzki turned the ball over several times in the crucial stretch and the team stayed scoreless on four straight possessions. With nine seconds to go, the Mavs had a one-point lead, when Kevin Durant hit a shot that bounced a couple of times on the rim and backboard and fell through with 1.5 seconds to go. Shawn Marion's attempt for a half court shot came too late and the Thunder took Game 1. Game 2 was closeout again, even though the Mavs were down by 16 in the first half. They came back and took the lead in the third quarter. The fourth quarter was much of a freethrow contest, James Harden made all of his late in the game and both, Nowitzki and Jason Terry missed his threes. Terry had two tries to send it to overtime, but missed. Thunder were up 2–0. The Thunder took a commanding 3–0 lead after their blowout win in Game 3. Despite having a 13-point lead going into the fourth quarter the Mavs lost by six in Game 4 and were swept.

Roster

Pre-season

|- bgcolor="#ffcccc"
| 1
| December 18
| Oklahoma City
| 
| Rodrigue BeauboisDominique Jones (17)
| Lamar Odom (7)
| Dominique Jones (9)
| American Airlines Center19,287
| 0–1
|- bgcolor="#ffcccc"
| 2
| December 20
| @ Oklahoma City
| 
| Jerome Randle (17)
| Ian Mahinmi (9)
| Dominique JonesBrian Cardinal (4)
| Chesapeake Energy Arena18,203
| 0–2
|-

Regular season

Standings

Record vs. opponents

Schedule

|- bgcolor="#ffcccc"
| 1
| December 25
| Miami
| 
| Jason Terry (23)
| Shawn Marion (6)
| seven players (3)
| American Airlines Center20,421
| 0–1
|- bgcolor="#ffcccc"
| 2
| December 26
| Denver
| 
| Dirk Nowitzki (20)
| Lamar Odom (7)
| three players (4)
| American Airlines Center20,408
| 0–2
|- bgcolor="#ffcccc"
| 3
| December 29
| @ Oklahoma City
| 
| Dirk Nowitzki (29)
| Dirk Nowitzki (10)
| Jason Terry (9)
| Chesapeake Energy Arena18,203
| 0–3
|- bgcolor="#ccffcc"
| 4
| December 30
| Toronto
| 
| Ian Mahinmi (19)
| Brendan Haywood (9)
| Jason Kidd (6)
| American Airlines Center20,307
| 1–3

|- bgcolor="#ffcccc"
| 5
| January 1
| @ Minnesota
| 
| Dirk Nowitzki (21)
| Shawn Marion (6)
| Jason Kidd (5)
| Target Center15,115
| 1–4
|- bgcolor="#ccffcc"
| 6
| January 2
| Oklahoma City
| 
| Dirk Nowitzki (26)
| Ian Mahinmi (9)
| Jason Kidd (9)
| American Airlines Center20,108
| 2–4
|- bgcolor="#ccffcc"
| 7
| January 4
| Phoenix
| 
| Dirk Nowitzki (20)
| Brendan Haywood (12)
| Dirk Nowitzki (7)
| American Airlines Center19,885
| 3–4
|- bgcolor="#ffcccc"
| 8
| January 5
| @ San Antonio
| 
| Jason Terry (12)
| Ian Mahinmi (9)
| Jason KiddDelonte West(3)
| AT&T Center18,581
| 3–5
|- bgcolor="#ccffcc"
| 9
| January 7
| New Orleans
| 
| Vince CarterIan Mahinmi(13)
| Ian Mahinmi (7)
| three players (4)
| American Airlines Center20,409
| 4–5
|- bgcolor="#ccffcc"
| 10
| January 10
| @ Detroit
| 
| Dirk Nowitzki (18)
| Dirk NowitzkiLamar Odom(7)
| 
| The Palace of Auburn Hills10,073
| 5–5
|- bgcolor="#ccffcc"
| 11
| January 11
| @ Boston
| 
| Jason Terry (18)
| Brendan Haywood (11)
| Dirk Nowitzki (4)
| TD Garden18,624
| 6–5
|- bgcolor="#ccffcc"
| 12
| January 13
| Milwaukee
| 
| Jason Terry (17)
| three players (6)
| Delonte West (4)
| American Airlines Center20,112
| 7–5
|- bgcolor="#ccffcc"
| 13
| January 14
| Sacramento
| 
| Jason Terry (21)
| Shawn Marion (8)
| Jason Kidd (6)
| American Airlines Center20,313
| 8–5
|- bgcolor="#ffcccc"
| 14
| January 16
| @ L.A. Lakers
| 
| Dirk Nowitzki (21)
| Ian Mahinmi (10)
| Jason Terry (7)
| Staples Center18,997
| 8–6
|- bgcolor="#ffcccc"
| 15
| January 18
| @ L.A. Clippers
| 
| Dirk NowitzkiDelonte West(17)
| Shawn Marion (10)
| Jason Kidd (10)
| Staples Center19,252
| 8–7
|- bgcolor="#ccffcc"
| 16
| January 19
| @ Utah
| 
| Shawn Marion (22)
| Shawn Marion (7)
| Jason Kidd (11)
| EnergySolutions Arena19,911
| 9–7
|- bgcolor="#ccffcc"
| 17
| January 21
| @ New Orleans
| 
| Lamar OdomDelonte West(22)
| Shawn Marion (12)
| Delonte West (6)
| New Orleans Arena15,471
| 10–7
|- bgcolor="#ccffcc"
| 18
| January 23
| Phoenix
| 
| Shawn Marion (29)
| Ian Mahinmi (9)
| Jason KiddLamar Odom(6)
| American Airlines Center19,944
| 11–7
|- bgcolor="#ffcccc"
| 19
| January 25
| Minnesota
| 
| Jason Terry (17)
| Brendan Haywood (10)
| Jason Kidd (7)
| American Airlines Center20,150
| 11–8
|- bgcolor="#ccffcc"
| 20
| January 27
| Utah
| 
| Rodrigue Beaubois (22)
| Brendan Haywood (12)
| Rodrigue Beaubois (7)
| American Airlines Center20,096
| 12–8
|- bgcolor="#ccffcc"
| 21
| January 29
| San Antonio
|  (OT)
| Jason Terry (34)
| Dirk Nowitzki (13)
| Rodrigue Beaubois (7)
| American Airlines Center20,262
| 13–8
|- bgcolor="#ccffcc"
| 22
| January 30
| @ Phoenix
| 
| Delonte West (25)
| Brendan Haywood (8)
| Rodrigue Beaubois (7)
| US Airways Center13,132
| 14–8

|- bgcolor="#ffcccc"
| 23
| February 1
| Oklahoma City
| 
| Jason Terry (25)
| Shawn Marion (10)
| Rodrigue Beaubois (4)
| American Airlines Center20,316
| 14–9
|- bgcolor="#ffcccc"
| 24
| February 3
| Indiana
| 
| Dirk Nowitzki (30)
| Shawn MarionDirk Nowitzki(7)
| Vince Carter (5)
| American Airlines Center20,146
| 14–10
|- bgcolor="#ffcccc"
| 25
| February 4
| @ Cleveland
| 
| Dirk Nowitzki (24)
| Dirk NowitzkiBrandan Wright(8)
| Delonte West (7)
| Quicken Loans Arena17,443
| 14–11
|- bgcolor="#ccffcc"
| 26
| February 8
| @ Denver
| 
| Dirk Nowitzki (25)
| Dirk Nowitzki (9)
| Vince Carter (8)
| Pepsi Center15,970
| 15–11
|- bgcolor="#ccffcc"
| 27
| February 10
| @ Minnesota
| 
| Dirk Nowitzki (33)
| Shawn Marion (8)
| Jason Kidd (10)
| Target Center17,119
| 16–11
|- bgcolor="#ccffcc"
| 28
| February 11
| Portland
| 
| Dirk Nowitzki (20)
| Shawn Marion (12)
| Jason Kidd (8)
| American Airlines Center20,457
| 17–11
|- bgcolor="#ccffcc"
| 29
| February 13
| L.A. Clippers
| 
| Dirk Nowitzki (22)
| Brendan Haywood (9)
| Jason Kidd (4)
| American Airlines Center20,436
| 18–11
|- bgcolor="#ccffcc"
| 30
| February 15
| Denver
| 
| Shawn Marion (16)
| Shawn Marion (10)
| Shawn MarionDominique Jones(6)
| American Airlines Center20,075
| 19–11
|- bgcolor="#ccffcc"
| 31
| February 17
| @ Philadelphia
| 
| Dirk Nowitzki (28)
| Dirk Nowitzki (12)
| Jason Kidd (8)
| Wells Fargo Center19,369
| 20–11
|- bgcolor="#ffcccc"
| 32
| February 19
| @ New York
| 
| Dirk Nowitzki (34)
| Shawn MarionJason Terry(7)
| Jason Terry (6)
| Madison Square Garden19,763
| 20–12
|- bgcolor="#ccffcc"
| 33
| February 20
| Boston
| 
| Dirk Nowitzki (26)
| Dirk Nowitzki (16)
| Jason Kidd (8)
| American Airlines Center20,364
| 21–12
|- bgcolor="#ffcccc"
| 34
| February 22
| L.A. Lakers
| 
| Dirk Nowitzki (25)
| Dirk Nowitzki (12)
| Shawn MarionJason Terry(5)
| American Airlines Center20,577
| 21–13
|- align="center"
|colspan="9" bgcolor="#bbcaff"|All-Star Break
|- bgcolor="#ffcccc"
| 35
| February 28
| New Jersey
| 
| Dirk Nowitzki (24)
| Brendan HaywoodDirk Nowitzki(10)
| Jason Kidd (8)
| American Airlines Center20,170
| 21–14
|- bgcolor="#ffcccc"
| 36
| February 29
| @ Memphis
| 
| Jason Terry (18)
| Shawn Marion (8)
| Jason Terry (5)
| FedExForum17,023
| 21–15

|- bgcolor="#ffcccc"
| 37
| March 2
| @ New Orleans
| 
| Rodrigue Beaubois (25)
| Dirk Nowitzki (9)
| Jason Kidd (6)
| New Orleans Arena15,568
| 21–16
|- bgcolor="#ccffcc"
| 38
| March 3
| Utah
| 
| Dirk Nowitzki (40)
| Ian Mahinmi (8)
| Jason Kidd (8)
| American Airlines Center20,560
| 22–16
|- bgcolor="#ffcccc"
| 39
| March 5
| @ Oklahoma City
| 
| Dirk Nowitzki (27)
| Shawn Marion (10)
| Jason Terry (7)
| Chesapeake Energy Arena18,203
| 22–17
|- bgcolor="#ccffcc"
| 40
| March 6
| New York
| 
| Dirk Nowitzki (28)
| Shawn Marion (9)
| Jason Kidd (6)
| American Airlines Center20,605
| 23–17
|- bgcolor="#ffcccc"
| 41
| March 8
| @ Phoenix
| 
| Vince CarterDirk Nowitzki(18)
| Shawn Marion (8)
| Vince Carter (4)
| US Airways Center15,498
| 23–18
|- bgcolor="#ffcccc"
| 42
| March 9
| @ Sacramento
| 
| Jason Terry (23)
| Dirk Nowitzki (9)
| Jason KiddRodrigue Beaubois(4)
| Power Balance Pavilion16,857
| 23–19
|- bgcolor="#ffcccc"
| 43
| March 10
| @ Golden State
| 
| Dirk Nowitzki (22)
| Ian Mahinmi (9)
| Dominique JonesJason Terry(5)
| Oracle Arena19,596
| 23–20
|- bgcolor="#ccffcc"
| 44
| March 13
| Washington
| 
| Dirk Nowitzki (27)
| Shawn Marion (13)
| three players (4)
| American Airlines Center20,319
| 24–20
|- bgcolor="#ccffcc"
| 45
| March 15
| Charlotte
| 
| Dirk Nowitzki (27)
| Brendan Haywood (8)
| Dirk Nowitzki (5)
| American Airlines Center20,507
| 25–20
|- bgcolor="#ccffcc"
| 46
| March 17
| San Antonio
| 
| Dirk Nowitzki (27)
| Brandan Wright (9)
| Jason Kidd (10)
| American Airlines Center20,528
| 26–20
|- bgcolor="#ccffcc"
| 47
| March 19
| @ Denver
| 
| Dirk Nowitzki (33)
| Dirk Nowitzki (11)
| Jason Kidd (10)
| Pepsi Center20,528
| 27–20
|- bgcolor="#ffcccc"
| 48
| March 21
| L.A. Lakers
| 
| Dirk Nowitzki (26)
| Dirk Nowitzki (10)
| Rodrigue Beaubois (5)
| American Airlines Center20,664
| 27–21
|- bgcolor="#ffcccc"
| 49
| March 23
| @ San Antonio
| 
| Jason Terry (18)
| Ian Mahinmi (10)
| Rodrigue Beaubois (5)
| AT&T Center18,581
| 27–22
|- bgcolor="#ccffcc"
| 50
| March 24
| @ Houston
| 
| Dirk Nowitzki (31)
| Shawn Marion (15)
| Jason Kidd (4)
| Toyota Center18,193
| 28–22
|- bgcolor="#ccffcc"
| 51
| March 27
| Houston
| 
| Dirk Nowitzki (21)
| Shawn Marion (11)
| Rodrigue Beaubois (5)
| American Airlines Center20,359
| 29–22
|- bgcolor="#ffcccc"
| 52
| March 29
| @ Miami
| 
| Dirk Nowitzki (21)
| Jason KiddDirk Nowitzki(6)
| Jason KiddJason Terry(4)
| American Airlines Arena20,096
| 29–23
|- bgcolor="#ccffcc"
| 53
| March 30
| @ Orlando
| 
| Dirk Nowitzki (28)
| Shawn Marion (9)
| Jason Kidd (6)
| Amway Center18,951
| 30–23

|- bgcolor="#ffcccc"
| 54
| April 2
| L.A. Clippers
| 
| Dirk Nowitzki (19)
| Shawn Marion (9)
| Delonte WestJason Terry(4)
| American Airlines Center20,479
| 30–24
|- bgcolor="ccffcc"
| 55
| April 4
| Memphis
| 
| Dirk Nowitzki (23)
| Ian MahinmiDirk Nowitzki(10)
| Rodrigue Beaubois (5)
| American Airlines Center20,233
| 31–24
|- bgcolor="#ffcccc"
| 56
| April 6
| Portland
| 
| Dirk Nowitzki (23)
| Dirk Nowitzki (14)
| three players (5)
| American Airlines Center20,544
| 31–25
|- bgcolor="#ffcccc"
| 57
| April 7
| @ Memphis
| 
| Dirk Nowitzki (17)
| Shawn Marion (11)
| Jason Terry (8)
| FedExForum18,119
| 31–26
|- bgcolor="ccffcc"
| 58
| April 10
| Sacramento
| 
| Dirk NowitzkiRodrigue Beaubois(15)
| Shawn Marion (14)
| Jason Kidd (7)
| American Airlines Center20,241
| 32–26
|- bgcolor="ccffcc"
| 59
| April 12
| @ Golden State
| 
| Dirk Nowitzki (27)
| Shawn Marion (12)
| Jason Kidd (12)
| Oracle Arena17,929
| 33–26
|- bgcolor="ccffcc"
| 60
| April 13
| @ Portland
| 
| Dirk Nowitzki (24)
| Shawn Marion (14)
| Delonte West (7)
| Rose Garden17,929
| 34–26
|-
|- bgcolor="#ffcccc"
| 61
| April 15
| @ L.A. Lakers
| 
| Dirk Nowitzki (24)
| Dirk Nowitzki (14)
| Jason Kidd (7)
| Staples Center18,997
| 34–27
|- bgcolor="#ffcccc"
| 62
| April 16
| @ Utah
| 
| Dirk Nowitzki (40)
| Vince Carter (12)
| Jason KiddDirk Nowitzki(6)
| EnergySolutions Arena19,363
| 34–28
|- bgcolor="#ccffcc"
| 63
| April 18
| Houston
| 
| Dirk Nowitzki (35)
| Shawn Marion (6)
| Jason Kidd (8)
| American Airlines Center20,508
| 35–28
|- bgcolor="#ccffcc"
| 64
| April 20
| Golden State
| 
| Vince Carter (21)
| Vince CarterIan Mahinmi(9)
| three players (4)
| American Airlines Center20,547
| 36–28
|- bgcolor="#ffcccc"
| 65
| April 21
| @ Chicago
| 
| Dirk Nowitzki (17)
| Dirk NowitzkiBrandan Wright(7)
| Rodrigue Beaubois (5)
| United Center20,547
| 36–29
|- bgcolor="#ffcccc"
| 66
| April 26
| @ Atlanta
| 
| Dirk Nowitzki (22)
| Shawn Marion (8)
| Rodrigue Beaubois (6)
| Philips Arena14,595
| 36–30

Playoffs

Game log

|- bgcolor=ffcccc
| 1
| April 28
| @ Oklahoma City
| 
| Dirk Nowitzki (25)
| Shawn Marion (8)
| Jason KiddJason Terry (5)
| Chesapeake Energy Arena18,203
| 0–1
|- bgcolor=ffcccc
| 2
| April 30
| @ Oklahoma City
| 
| Dirk Nowitzki (31)
| Shawn Marion (8)
| Jason Kidd (7)
| Chesapeake Energy Arena18,203
| 0–2
|- bgcolor=ffcccc
| 3
| May 3
| Oklahoma City
| 
| Dirk Nowitzki (17)
| Shawn Marion (10)
| Jason Terry (6)
| American Airlines Center20,640
| 0–3
|- bgcolor=ffcccc
| 4
| May 5
| Oklahoma City
| 
| Dirk Nowitzki (34)
| Vince Carter (8)
| Jason Kidd (8)
| American Airlines Center20,533
| 0–4

Player statistics

Season

|-
| 
|| 3 || 0 || 6.0 || .375 || .333 || .000 || 0.00 || 0.00 || 0.33 || .00 || 2.3
|-
| 
|| 53 || 12 || 21.7 || .422 || .288 || .841 || 2.80 || 2.9 || 1.06 || .53 || 8.9
|-
| 
|| 44 || 0 || 6.3 || .255 || .204 || .833 || .80 || .4 || .18 || .05 || 1.0
|-
| 
|| 61 || 40 || 25.3 || .411 || .361 || .826 || 3.40 || 2.3 || .92 || .41 || 10.1
|-
| 
|| 54 || 54 || 21.2 || .518 || .000 || .469 || 6.00 || .4 || .44 || 1.00 || 5.2
|-
| 
|| 33 || 1 || 8.1 || .397 || .125 || .784 || 1.30 || 1.3 || .30 || .15 || 2.7
|-
| 
|| 48 || 48 || 28.7 || .363 || .354 || .786 || 4.10 || style="background:#0B60AD;color:white;" |5.5 || style="background:#0B60AD;color:white;" |1.71 || .21 || 6.2
|-
| 
|| 61 || 12 || 18.7 || .546 || .000 || .639 || 4.70 || .2 || .62 || .51 || 5.8
|-
| 
| 63 || style="background:#0B60AD;color:white;" |63 || 30.5 || .446 || .294 || .796 || style="background:#0B60AD;color:white;" |7.40 || 2.1 || 1.06 || .57 || 10.6
|-
| 
|| 62 || 62 || style="background:#0B60AD;color:white;" |33.5 || .457 || .368 || style="background:#0B60AD;color:white;" |.896 || 6.80 || 2.2 || .68 || .48 || style="background:#0B60AD;color:white;" |21.6
|-
| 
|| 50 || 4 || 20.5 || .352 || .252 || .592 || 4.20 || 1.7 || .40 || .40 || 6.6
|-
| 
| 63 || 1 || 31.7 || .430 || style="background:#0B60AD;color:white;" |.378 || .883 || 2.40 || 3.6 || 1.16 || .17 || 15.1
|-
| 
|| 44 || 33 || 24.1 || .461 || .355 || .886 || 2.30 || 3.2 || 1.32 || .25 || 9.6
|-
| 
|| 8 || 0 || 8.1 || style="background:#0B60AD;color:white;" |.750 || .000 || .833 || 1.60 || .3 || .13 || .63 || 3.6
|-
| 
|| 49 || 0 || 16.1 || .618 || .000 || .634 || 3.60 || .3 || .45 || style="background:#0B60AD;color:white;" |1.29 || 6.9
|-
| 
|| 30 || 0 || 6.8 || .378 || .300 || .667 || 1.60 || .2 || .23 || .27 || 2.6
|}

Playoffs

|-
| 
|| 1 || 0 || 5.0 || .333 || 1.000 || .000 || 1.00 || 0.0 || 1.00 || 0.00 || 3.0
|-
| 
|| 2 || 0 || 6.0 || .000 || .000 || .000 || 0.50 || 1.0 || 0.00 || 0.00 || 0.0
|-
| 
|| 2 || 0 || 4.5 || .500 || 1.000 || .000 || 1.50 || 0.0 || 0.00 || 0.00 || 1.5
|-
| 
|| 4 || 0 || 26.8 || .293 || .300 || .750 || 5.50 || 0.3 || 1.25 || .50 || 8.3
|-
| 
|| 4 || 4 || 15.3 || .286 || .000 || .625 || 3.30 || 0.3 || 0.25 || .50 || 3.3
|-
| 
|| 0 || 0 || 0.0 || .000 || .000 || .000 || 0.00 || 0.0 || 0.00 || 0.00 || 0.0
|-
| 
|| 4 || 4 || 36.0 || .341 || .346 || .900 || 6.00 || style="background:#0B60AD;color:white;" |6.0 || style="background:#0B60AD;color:white;" |3.00 || 0.25 || 11.5
|-
| 
|| 4 || 0 || 17.5 || style="background:#0B60AD;color:white;" |.643 || .000 || .846 || 4.50 || 0.0 || .75 || .75 || 7.3
|-
| 
|| 4 || 4 || 35.0 || .425 || .286 || .900 || style="background:#0B60AD;color:white;" |8.00 || 1.0 || .25 || style="background:#0B60AD;color:white;" |1.25 || 11.8
|-
| 
|| 4 || 4 || style="background:#0B60AD;color:white;" |38.5 || .442 || .167 || .905 || 6.30 || 1.8 || .75 || 0.00 || style="background:#0B60AD;color:white;" |26.8
|-
| 
|| 4 || 0 || 34.8 || .455 || .500 || .625 || 2.30 || 3.8 || .25 || 0.00 || 13.8
|-
| 
|| 4 || 3 || 22.0 || .423 || .500 || style="background:#0B60AD;color:white;" |1.000 || 1.80 || 2.0 || .75 || 0.00 || 7.5
|-
| 
|| 4 || 0 || 6.8 || .400 || .000 || .500 || 1.30 || 0.0 || .25 || .25 || 1.3
|-
| 
|| 1 || 0 || 5.0 || .333 || .000 || .000 || 2.00 || 0.0 || 1.00 || 0.00 || 2.0
|}

Awards, records and milestones

All-Star 
 Dirk Nowitzki was voted to his 11th NBA All-Star Game.

Milestones
 On January 1, Brendan Haywood recorded his 1,000th block during a game against the Minnesota Timberwolves.
 On January 2, Dirk Nowitzki recorded his 8,000th made field goal during a game against the Oklahoma City Thunder.
 On January 4, Dirk Nowitzki played in his 1,000th game against the Phoenix Suns.
 On January 13, Dirk Nowitzki recorded his 23,000th point during a game against the Milwaukee Bucks.
 On January 17, Vince Carter recorded his 20,000th point during a game against the New York Knicks.
 On February 20, Dirk Nowitzki recorded his 1,000th block during a game against the Boston Celtics.
 On February 20, Dirk Nowitzki moved up to Number 20 on the all-time scoring list during a game against the Boston Celtics.
 On February 20, Jason Kidd moved up to Number two on the all time steals list during a game against the Boston Celtics.
 On March 10, Jason Terry played in his 1,000th game against the Golden State Warriors.
 On April 4, Vince Carter recorded his 21,000th point during a game against the Memphis Grizzlies.
 On April 4, Jason Terry moved up to Number five on the all time 3-point scoring leaders list during a game against the Memphis Grizzlies.
 On April 15, Dirk Nowitzki recorded his 24,000th point during a game against the Los Angeles Lakers.

Injuries
Shawn Marion fractured his left little finger during the opening game against the Miami Heat but did not miss a game. Marion was ill but played against the Phoenix Suns.
In a game against San Antonio, Jason Kidd was subbed out with under a minute to go in the first quarter and went straight into the Mavs' locker room and was diagnosed with a lower back injury and did not return to the game. He missed the game at New Orleans and two more games. He then missed the game at home against Milwaukee before returning versus the Sacramento Kings. Vince Carter injured his left foot, x-rays showed that it was a sprain. He missed the next four games. He returned against Utah. Dirk Nowitzki sat four games because of a sore knee. Delonte West was out against Utah due to a harmstring injury. Kidd left the Game versus Utah due to a strain calf and missed more than a week. Marion injured his knee against Oklahoma but did not miss a game. He, Lamar Odom and Brendan Haywood, the latter two missed the game against Oklahoma, returned to play against Indiana.
Jason Terry and Rodrigue Beaubois were out against the Denver Nuggets. Terry joined the team at New York.
West went out against the Nuggets before halftime and had fractured, dislocated finger and missed 4–6 weeks.
Nowitzki left the game against Memphis with a back injury and was listed day-to-day but returned for the next game.
Brandan Wright missed the game against Utah due to a concussion.
Haywood sprained his ankle at Oklahoma. He sprained his knee against Charlotte and missed five games.
Marion missed three games with a sore left knee. Kidd and Odom both missed the Game against the Clippers, Kidd with a groin injury which kept him out for a week and Odom was ill. Odom returned against Memphis, one game later. Beaubois missed the games at the Los Angeles Lakers and Jazz due to a right calf strain. He returned the next game against Houston. He dislocated his finger against Chicago but was able to return to the game.

Transactions

Trades

Free agents

Additions

Subtractions

 On April 9, the Mavericks and Odom decided to part ways. Odom stays away from the team and will be listed as inactive until the season ends.

References

Dallas Mavericks seasons
Dallas Mavericks
Dallas
Dallas
2010s in Dallas